The Swedish War of Liberation (1521–23), also known as Gustav Vasa's Rebellion and the Swedish War of Secession, was a rebellion and a civil war in which the nobleman Gustav Vasa deposed King Christian II from the throne of Sweden; ending the Kalmar Union between Sweden, Norway, and Denmark.

Background 
King Christian II and his ally, the Swedish Archbishop Gustav Trolle, the scion of a prominent unionist noble family, had tried to eliminate the separatist Sture party among the Swedish nobility by executing a large number of them in the Stockholm Bloodbath. The King was also unpopular for imposing high taxes on the peasantry. Furthermore, German and Danish nobles and commoners held most Swedish castles and this provoked the native Swedish nobles.

Economics 
In the background was an economic power struggle over the mining and metal industry in Bergslagen (the main mining area of Sweden in the 16th century) which added much greater financial resources to military capacity, but also strong dependencies, to a conflict that already lasted for decades over the Kalmar Union. An economic struggle, where the parties were financed and stood between:
 Jakob Fugger (early extremely rich industrialist in the mining and metal industry on the continent) trying an unfriendly business-takeover of Bergslagen, allied with those of Fugger's economically dependent Pope Leo X (with the Swedish Archbishop Gustav Trolle) and Maximilian I, Holy Roman Emperor in alliance with Christian II of Denmark/Norway, claiming being the union king (also in Sweden), where his marriage in 1515 with Isabella of Austria confirmed the pact.
 The Hanseatic League (the Free City of Lübeck) who in practice had a trade monopoly in Sweden and Bergslagen, allied with the regents of Sweden Sten Sture the younger and later Gustav Vasa, who made them strongly dependent on the Hanseatic League.

The planned conquest of Sweden by Christian II, with Fugger's intended takeover of the industry in Bergslagen, was financed with a very large dowry, for Christian II's wife, financed by Fugger. Fugger later withdrew from the battle in 1521 after losing to Gustav Vasa in the Battle of Västerås (and the control over shipping from Bergslagen). Thus, Christian II lost the resources to win the war against Gustav Vasa, but also lost the resources to maintain his position in Denmark (against uncle Frederick I of Denmark 1523).

The sharp increase in funding and financial dependence meant that at times the parties could keep up with larger amounts of expensive hired mercenaries, which explains the swinging of power and quickly changes of the situation, during the course of the proceedings. The costs were significant and after Christian III's victory with Gustav Vasa's Sweden as ally 1536 in Count's Feud in Skåne and Denmark, the money was gone, the Catholic Church's and the Hanseatic League's influence in the Nordic countries was over.

Rebellion 1521 
The war started in January 1521 when Gustav Vasa was appointed hövitsman (commander) over Dalarna by representatives of the population in the northern part of the province. After Gustav Vasa sacked the copper mine of Stora Kopparberget and the town of Västerås, more men joined his army. In 1522, the Hanseatic city of Lübeck allied with the Swedish rebels. After the capture of Stockholm in June 1523, the rebels effectively controlled Sweden, and on 6 June Gustav Vasa was elected King of Sweden in the town of Strängnäs. By September, Swedish Finland was also controlled by Gustav Vasa's supporters. By the Treaty of Malmö signed on 1 September 1524, Sweden seceded from the Kalmar Union.

Gustav's role in the war against Christian II was initially as one of several rebel leaders, active in different parts of the country, and the war that eventually made him king was only partially initiated and led by him. The fact that historiography has often used the term "Gustav Vasa's war of liberation" is thus mainly due to the results of the war - Gustav Vasa as king of an independent Sweden - rather than to its initial driving forces and course. Current research also clearly shows that Gustav himself did not lead any military operations but left this to associates with greater experience of war.

Dalarna 
The details of Gustav Vasa's activities in Dalarna 1520 are largely unknown, as there are very few sources. The most comprehensive of them is written during Gustav's reign by his close associate, the bishop of Västerås Peder Andreæ Swart and is seen by some historians as more or less dictated by Gustav himself.

In 1520, Gustav Vasa traveled to the Swedish province of Dalarna, disguised as a farmer to avoid detection by King Christian's scouts. In December, Gustav Vasa arrived in the city of Mora, where he asked the peasantry for their help in his revolt against Christian II. The peasants refused his request, so Gustav Vasa decided to travel north to find men who would support his revolt. Shortly thereafter, a couple of refugees arrived in Mora, where they told the peasantry about the brutality of Christian II and his men. The people of Mora then decided to find Gustav Vasa and join his revolt. They sent two skilled skiers to find him. In Sälen, they finally caught up with him. 

The Vasaloppet is a huge long distance 90 km (56 mi) ski-race is inspired by this notable journey fleeing from Christian II's soldiers during the winter of 1520–1521, but performed reverse from Sälen back to Mora. According to legend, he fled on skis. The modern competition started in 1922 and it has been a part of the Worldloppet events since 1979. Vasaloppet is the ski-race of the year in Sweden and seen by many Swedes (TV-viewers) as bigger than the World ski Championships (that some years are performed the same day independently of each other), about 15,000 are the maximum attendance limit and is sold out in hours, a few hundred international elite contenders. Total attendance for the entire Vasalopp-week races 70,200 (2015). It is the oldest cross-country ski race in the world, as well as the one with the highest number of participants.

Back in Mora, on New Year's Eve, 1521, Gustav Vasa was appointed to "hövitsman" by envoys from all the parishes of North Dalarna.

In March, Gustav Vasa marched out from Mora with about 100 men and sacked Kopparberg. Shortly thereafter, the peasantry of Bergslagen joined the revolt. Gustav Vasa's army had now grown to over 1,000 men.

Battle of Brunnbäck Ferry 
When news of the Swedish revolt reached Christian II, he sent a force of Landknechten to crush the rebellion. In April 1521, the union forces confronted Gustav Vasa's men at Brunnbäck Ferry, and the King's army was crushed. This victory greatly improved the Swedish rebels' morale.

In Dalarna, an emergency mint was established in order to produce the copper coins necessary to finance the war.

Västerås - the turning point 
The rebel army continued south to Västerås, which they conquered and sacked in the Battle of Västerås 29 April 1521. When words of Gustav Vasa's success spread across Sweden, the supporters of the Sture family decided to join the revolt. Västerås became a turning point in the faith of Gustav Vasa's abilities, the rebels got the control over shipping from Bergslagen and Fugger stopped funding Christian II.  

Gustav Trolle had been sent to Hälsingland in April, but when his two hundred cavalry saw the thousand-headed peasant army, they fled south and at the end of April 1521, Gustav Vasa was lord of Dalarna and had the support of Gästrikland , Västmanland and Närke with the exception of the castles.

On July 15, 1521, the National Assembly was held in Stockholm. Gustav Vasa was offered a free lease to Stockholm. Everything would be forgiven. To prove this, Gustav Trolle had Didrik Slagheck locked up, and large quantities of malt and hops were also promised. Gustav Vasa waited. Soon the revolt had reached Brunkeberg, but the peasants could not possibly storm the city.

It became calmer during the summer of 1521. Many went home for so long to their farms and helped with the harvest.

After Västerås - Professional armies
The peasant armies became less and less important in the warfare, which was now instead carried out by German mercenaries and Swedish soldiers who were recruited for a fee, reinforced by cavalry from the Swedish nobility.

1521 -  Gustav Vasa becomes head of state 
Lars Siggesson Sparre, who was also hostage to Christian II but who went over to the king's side, now went over to Gustav Vasa. Hans Brask and Ture Jönsson Tre Rosor also transferred to Gustav Vasa and during the latter half of August he was recognized by Götalandskapen as Sweden's courtier and head of state at a lords day in Vadstena. At the same time, the government appointed by Christian II left Sweden's territory.

The lords day that appointed Gustav as head of state in the meeting in Vadstena 1521, consisted of a relatively small circle of great men, mainly from the southern provinces. The peasants and others who carried him forward in the earlier stages of the uprising were not represented. At the same time, most of the nobility in Östergötland, Sörmland and Uppland still clung to the Union King Christian. The continued spread of the uprising and the election of the noble Gustav as head of state, however, caused many to change sides, or to flee to Denmark to avoid being killed.

1522 - The Hansa joins 
Just before Christmas 1521, the commander of  Stegeborg in Östergötland, Berend von Melen, transferred to Gustav Eriksson and the castle Stegeborg fell into the hands of the rebel army. In Berend, Gustav got an associate with great military experience and good contacts with the Hansa in Lübeck. 

Örebro and Västerås castles were besieged and captured at the beginning of 1522. The most important of the fortresses survived, however, and Gustav and the men around him realized that they could not be conquered without warships and heavy artillery. 

They began negotiations with Lübeck, who had their own interest in being able to trade without being hindered by the Danish king's restrictions. Lübeck was promised freedom of customs in Sweden against help with ships, warriors, cannons and other scarce goods. From May, Lübeck took an active part in the war and the Danish strongholds in Stockholm and Kalmar were subjected to an increasingly intense siege during the autumn. At the same time, Gustav, Berend von Melen and Lübeck began planning an operation to conquer Skåne and other East Danish landscapes. The naval battle near Stockholm prevented important food from reaching the Danish crew in Stockholm.

1523 - Gustav Vasa becomes king 
The campaign towards Skåne was prepared in January 1523 but was not carried out. Instead, Blekinge and parts of the Norwegian Bohuslän were conquered. In March, Christian II was deposed by a Danish uprising and Frederick I was elected king of Denmark. Thus, Lübeck's interest in collaborating with Gustav to conquer Scania disappeared, and the campaign was interrupted.  

 Kalmar was taken on 27 May 1523. Gustav Eriksson (Vasa) was appointed King of Sweden at the Parliament in Strängnäs on 6 June 1523. 

 Stockholm was taken over on June 17, and on Midsummer's Eve, June 23, 1523, the newly elected King Gustav was able to make his entrance into the capital. During the summer and autumn the last strongholds in the Finnish part of the country gave way and during the late autumn Gustav began a failed attempt to conquer Gotland from Denmark.

1523 - Change of power in Denmark 
The events in Sweden meant that Christian II's regime was also questioned in Denmark. Due to the executions of several bishops in Stockholm Bloodbath, he came into a tense relationship with the church both in Rome and in Denmark, and as a failed attempt to create a scapegoat, he had his adviser Didrik Slagheck, whom he had recently appointed Archbishop of Lund, executed in January 1522. Christian also enforced a new national ground law which restricted the power of the nobility and which established that the royal power would be hereditary. In response, Jutland's bishops and councilors called for an uprising against Christian, who after fruitless negotiations left Denmark in April 1523 and sailed to the Netherlands with his family and his unpopular adviser Sigbrit Willoms. The insurgents' candidate for the royal crown was Christian's uncle Frederik av Gottorp, who on 7 August 1524 was crowned King of Denmark Frederick I of Denmark.

Christian had tried to limit the power of Lübeck and Hansa and make Copenhagen a free staple city and trade hub. With Frederik's accession to power, which in practice took place as early as April 1523, this policy was changed and Lübeck, who supported the Danish uprising, was promised freedom from customs not only in Denmark and Norway but also in Sweden. Frederik thus initially had plans to pay tribute as king in Sweden as well, but gave up these thoughts when Lübeck did not give him the support he had hoped for. Lübeck had no interest in a re-created Nordic union but preferred to have good political relations, and thus good trade conditions, with all the Nordic countries.

1524 - Peace 
Gustav Vasa and Frederik I met in Malmö in August 1524 through mediation from Lübeck. Shortly afterwards, a peace treaty had been reached, in which Lübeck and Hansa were given the task of interpreting the question of the belonging of the East Danish provinces in the long term. The peace was concluded on September 1, 1524 and is generally called  Malmö recess. The final result was that Blekinge, Skåne and Gotland remained Danish and that Sweden returned the conquered northern Bohuslän to Norway, which was subject to Denmark.

Aftermath

The Count's Feud in Denmark 1536 - The Catholic Church and the Hanseatic League is out of money
The Swedish War of Liberation ended with Count's Feud in Skåne and Denmark 1536 with Christian III's victory with Gustav Vasa's Sweden as ally. 

The money was gone for the Catholic Church and the Hanseatic League and their influence in the Nordic countries was over, and with it comes the Lutheran Reformation in Sweden (and the Reformation in Denmark). The previously for hundreds of years very influential and wealthy Hanseatic League quickly just fades away from the political scene, being on the wrong side just in the very end of the war.

The new Baltic competition emerges 
The old issues were solved in the end by the understanding of Gustav Vasa and Christian III, and peace lasted for 25 years as long as the two kings were alive. 

After the deaths of Christian III and Gustav Vasa, in 1559 and 1560 respectively, both countries now had young and hawkish monarchs, Eric XIV of Sweden and Frederick II of Denmark. Frederick II envisioned the resurrection of the Kalmar Union under Danish leadership, while Eric wanted to finally break the dominating position of Denmark. 

By 1563 and the Northern Seven Years' War, Sweden and Denmark were finding each other as competitors of the political and economical power over the Baltic region. In 1561, when a sizeable remnant of the Order states in the northern Baltics were secularized by its grand master Gotthard Kettler, both Denmark and Sweden were attracted to intervene in the Livonian War. A competition that lasts over 5 major wars between the countries until 1679 with the Scanian War.

The Lutheran Reformation 
The dependencies were strong, the pope stood firm, Sweden was for 15 years under papal interdict, church strike (no functioning national church), and the Lutheran Reformation in Sweden was carried out. The regent got an offer by the Lutherans that can't be resisted, a state church with the clerical as the kings governmental civil servants, never reinstating a relation with the Catholic church. The nationalization of the Catholic church funded the new sovereigns regime.

The Sovereign Swedish state
It is 500 years later still seen as a general national "paradigm shift".

The war freed Sweden from international economic and political dependencies and outspoken enemies influence. An independence that has lasted so far for the past 500 years (local security/peace since 1523, no foreign armies on its soil except in border areas and general peace for over 200 years since 1814). This liberation war is widely seen and held in high esteem by the Swedes as the root of the political and economic independence, the structure and organization of its society today. Seen by Swedes as a national "paradigm shift" where the foundations of society's views have radically changed to what is still fundamentally the case.

Battles 
 Battle of Falun (February 1521)
 Battle of Brunnbäck Ferry (April 1521)
 Battle of Västerås (29 April 1521)
 Conquest of Uppsala (18 May 1521)
 Conquest of Kalmar (27 May 1523)
 Conquest of Stockholm (16–17 June 1523)

See also 

 Wars of national liberation

References 

 
 
 
 

 
Wars involving Denmark
Wars involving Sweden
History of Lübeck
Wars involving the Hanseatic League
Wars of independence
16th-century rebellions
1520s in Sweden
1520s in Denmark
1521 in Sweden
1521 in Denmark
1522 in Sweden
1522 in Denmark
1523 in Sweden
1523 in Denmark